is a song by Japanese singer-songwriter Hikaru Utada. It was released digitally 15 April 2016, alongside "Hanataba o Kimi ni" as joint singles for her album Fantôme. The song is the theme to NTV's news show NEWS ZERO. The single is Utada's first release since 2012's Evangelion: 3.0 theme song "Sakura Nagashi", and marks her official comeback to the Japanese music scene.

Track listing

Credits 
Credits adapted from Fantôme liner notes.

Release history

Charts

Weekly and monthly charts

Certifications

References

2016 singles
Hikaru Utada songs
Songs written by Hikaru Utada
2016 songs
Universal Music Japan singles